The Journey is a 2017 Iraqi drama film co-edited, written, co-produced, and directed by Mohamed Jabarah Al-Daradji. It was screened in the Contemporary World Cinema section at the 2017 Toronto International Film Festival. Upon premiering on 1 March 2018 in Iraq, the film became the first Iraqi film in 27 years to be released in the theaters of Iraq. It was selected as the Iraqi entry for the Best Foreign Language Film at the 91st Academy Awards, but it was not nominated.

Cast
Zahraa Ghandour as Sara
Ameer Ali Jabarah as Salam

See also
 List of submissions to the 91st Academy Awards for Best Foreign Language Film
 List of Iraqi submissions for the Academy Award for Best Foreign Language Film

References

External links

2017 films
2017 drama films
2010s Arabic-language films
Films directed by Mohamed Al-Daradji
Iraqi drama films